The men's volleyball tournament at the 2019 Southeast Asian Games was held at the PhilSports Arena in Pasig between 2 and 10 December 2019.

Draw
The draw for the men's volleyball tournament was held on 15 October 2019 at the Sofitel Manila in Pasay. Malaysia entered the tournament but withdrew shortly prior to the draw. Timor Leste, which were drawn in Group A, withdrew after the draw has taken place. The Philippines as host chose the group which it wanted to be allocated in.

Participating nations

Results

Preliminary round

Group A

|}

|}

Group B

|}

|}

Final round

5th–7th place play-off

|}

Semifinals

|}

Fifth place match

|}

Bronze medal match

|}

Gold medal match

|}

Final standings

See also
Women's tournament

References

External links
  

Men